The Centre de la Mer et des Eaux was an aquarium and museum of marine life located in the 5th arrondissement in the building of the Institut Océanographique at 195, rue Saint-Jacques, Paris, France. It closed in November 2010. Dedicated to the dissemination of scientific culture concerning the marine world and to the development of knowledge of the ocean, it included a library, seven aquariums, and presented permanent and temporary exhibitions, as well as scientific mediations, animations and workshops.

The Institut Océanographique was established in 1906 by Albert I, Prince of Monaco, and inaugurated in 1911. In addition to research laboratories and amphitheaters, the institute contained the Centre de la Mer et des Eaux dedicated to educating the public about marine life and related environmental issues. Its displays presented aspects of oceanography and marine technology, as well as scale models, reconstructions of marine landscapes, and aquariums.

 Pool 1 – fish of the coral reef
 Pool 2 – reef coral and fauna that live within it
 Pool 3 – Brightly colored fish
 Pool 4 – Small fish
 Pool 5 – Clown fish and sea anemone
 Pool 6 – The French Atlantic coast (shellfish, sea urchins, sea anemones, and starfish, in water chilled to 12 °C)

An additional terrarium contained turtles that had been given to the museum when they had become too large and aggressive for home cultivation. Special displays explained the richness of life in coastal and around hydrothermal vents, and illustrated the relationships between humans and four types of shellfish (scallop, oyster, cowry, and the nautilus).

See also 
 List of museums in Paris

References

External links 
 
 
 
 
 Paris.org entry
 Paris.fr entry
 

Aquaria in Paris
Defunct museums in Paris
Buildings and structures in the 15th arrondissement of Paris
Museums established in 1911
Museums disestablished in 2010
Defunct aquaria
1911 establishments in France
2010 disestablishments in France